Jean-René Asseline (1742-1813) was a French bishop and theologian.

Life
His early posts were as grand vicar to Christophe de Beaumont, archbishop of Paris, and teaching scripture and theology at the Sorbonne. In 1789 he was made bishop of Boulogne and commendatory abbot of Ham Abbey - he held both posts until the following year, when the abbey and the bishopric were both suppressed. He refused to swear the oath to obey the Civil Constitution of the Clergy in 1791 and emigrated to Munster, from where he criticized the Concordat of 1801. In 1807 he was summoned by Louis XVIII and served the French royal family until his death in 1813.

Works
 Instruction pastorale - 1790
 Instruction sur les atteintes portées à la religion - 1798
 Considérations sur le mystère de la croix, tirées des divines écritures et des œuvres des SS. Pères - Société Typographique Paris - 1806
 Exposition abrégée du symbole des apôtres - Société Typographique Paris - 1806
 La neuvaine a l'honneur de saint François Xavier de la Compagnie de Jésus, Apôtre des Indes & du Japon MDCCLXXV - Imprimerie Louis Buisson - Lyon

References

Bibliography 
 "Asseline (Jean-René)", in Michaud, Biographie universelle ancienne et moderne..., Paris, Thoisnier Desplaces, 1843–1865, t. 2, 

Bishops of Boulogne
18th-century French Catholic theologians
19th-century French Catholic theologians
1742 births
1813 deaths
18th-century French Roman Catholic bishops
Academic staff of the University of Paris